William Frederick Wakeman (1822 – 15 October 1900) was an Irish archaeologist, initially producing works as an artist and then as an author.

Life
W. F. Wakeman was born in Dublin, 1822. His father was a publisher. A student of George Petrie, Wakeman produced pen and pencil sketches of land features and antiquities while employed as a draughtsman by the Ordnance Survey of Ireland. The works of this period are held by the Royal Irish Academy.

After the closing of the topographical department of the Survey, he took teaching roles at St. Columba's College in County Meath and the Portora Royal and District National Model schools in Enniskillen, County Fermanagh. He eventually abandoned art to pursue his interest in archaeology.

Wakeman died on 15 October 1900, in Coleraine, County Londonderry.

Works

As illustrator only

References

Archaeologists from Dublin (city)
Irish draughtsmen
1822 births
1900 deaths